Karlivka is a village in Marinka Raion of Donetsk Oblast in eastern Ukraine. It lies approximately 10 miles west of Donetsk, adjacent to Highway M04, on the southern side of the Karlivske Reservoir.

Its population in 2001 was 414 people.

On May 23, 2014, Karlivka saw fighting between the Ukrainian forces and pro-Russian separatists as part of the 2014 pro-Russian conflict in Ukraine. On 23 July 2014, Ukrainian forces reportedly secured the village from the pro-Russian separatists.

References

Villages in Pokrovsk Raion
Yekaterinoslav Governorate
Former German settlements in Donetsk Oblast